Out of Many, One: Portraits of America's Immigrants is a book by former United States president George W. Bush published in April 2021. The book includes forty-three oil portraits of American immigrants. It was a New York Times bestseller.

History
Bush announced the project in August 2020 through an Instagram post. Prior to the working on the book, Bush met all of the immigrants whose stories are covered in the book. In creating the book, Bush stated "My hope is that Out of Many, One will help focus our collective attention on the positive effects that immigrants have on our country."

Out of Many, One quickly became a New York Times bestseller. The book was also a Newsmax conservative bestseller during the week of May 1, 2021. The paintings and stories were put on display at the George W. Bush Presidential Center in Texas.

See also
 ''Portraits of Courage: A Commander in Chief's Tribute to America's Warriors, (Bush, 2017)
''Salim Asrawi & Other Immigrants Featured in George W. Bush's new book 'Out of Many, One'''

References

2021 non-fiction books
Books by George W. Bush
English-language books
Political books
Books about immigration to the United States
Works about painting
Books about visual art
American non-fiction books
Crown Publishing Group books
Books written by presidents of the United States